Schizodactylidae is a family of orthopteran insects found in Asia and southern Africa, known as dune crickets or splay-footed crickets. They are usually found in desert and sandy areas. Species are predatory, including Schizodactylus inexspectatus. T. B. Fletcher notes that one captive individual did not feed on any vegetable matter. Fossils are known since the Early Cretaceous.

Taxonomy
One extinct and two extant genera in the subfamily Schizodactylinae are included:
†Brauckmannia Martins-Neto, 2007
 monotypic †B. groeningae Martins-Neto, 2007  Crato Formation, Brazil, Early Cretaceous (Aptian)

Comicus Brunner von Wattenwyl, 1888 
 Comicus capensis Brunner von Wattenwyl, 1888 - type species

Schizodactylus
Authority: Brullé, 1835; distribution: mainland Asia
 Schizodactylus brevinotus Ingrisch, 2002
 Schizodactylus burmanus Uvarov, 1935
 Schizodactylus hesperus Bei-Bienko, 1967
 Schizodactylus inexspectatus (Werner, F., 1901)
 Schizodactylus jimo He, 2021
 Schizodactylus minor Ander, 1938
 Schizodactylus monstrosus (Drury, 1773) - type species (as Gryllus monstrosus Drury)
 Schizodactylus salweenensis Dawwrueng et al., 2018
 Schizodactylus tuberculatus Ander, 1938

References

External links
 Family page with determination key

Ensifera
Orthoptera families
Permian first appearances
Orthoptera of Africa
Orthoptera of Asia